J. Emrys Morgan Cup is an Association Football knockout cup competition for football clubs in the lower leagues of the Welsh Football Association pyramid in the Mid and West Wales regions. It consists of a round by round knockout with semi-finals and the final played a neutral ground. Teams are drawn to play each other home or away in rounds up to the semi-finals. The following leagues are covered by the cup:

 Aberystwyth League
 Ceredigion League
 Mid Wales South League
 Montgomeryshire Football League

Previous winners

1972–73: – Aberystwyth Town reserves 
1973–74: – Llansantffraid 
1974–75: – Ffostrasol 
1975–76: – Llanfyllin 
1976–77: – Newcastle Emlyn
1977–78: – Llanfair Caereinion
1978–79: – Welshpool Rangers 
1979–80: – Builth Wells
1980–81: – Newtown reserves 
1981–82: – Aber A.C. 
1982–83: – Bow Street 
1983–84: – Llanfair Caereinion
1984–85: – Vale of Arrow 
1985–86: – Llanfair Caereinion
1986–87: – Maesglas FC 
1987–88: – Maesglas FC 
1988–89: – Vale of Arrow 
1989–90: – Llangedwyn
1990–91: – Llanfair Caereinion
1991–92: – Newcastle Emlyn
1992–93: – Dewi Stars 
1993–94: – Sennybridge
1994–95: – St Dogmaels 
1995–96: – Kerry 
1996–97: – Padarn United
1997–98: – Saron 
1998–99: – Cardigan 
1999–2000: – Bow Street 
2000–01: – Talybont 
2001–02: – Dolgellau Athletic 
2002–03: – Aberaeron 
2003–04: – Knighton Town 
2004–05: – Rhosgoch 
2005–06: – Bow Street 
2006–07: – Tregaron Turfs 
2007–08: – Penparcau
2008–09: – Hay St. Mary  
2009–10: – Llandrindod Wells
2010–11: – New Quay
2011–12: – Penybont United
2012–13: – Borth United
2013–14: – Lampeter Town
2014–15: – Cardigan Town 
2015–16: – Llanfair United reserves
2016–17: – Llandysul
2017–18: – Newcastle Emlyn
2018–19: – Penparcau
2019–20: – Competition cancelled due to the COVID-19 pandemic
2020–21: – Competition cancelled due to the COVID-19 pandemic
2021–22: – Brecon Corries

References

Football cup competitions in Wales
County Cup competitions
Recurring sporting events established in 1972
Football in Wales
1972 establishments in Wales